Pößneck (also spelled Poessneck) is a town in the Saale-Orla-Kreis district, in Thuringia, Germany. It is situated 19 km east of Rudolstadt, and 26 km south of Jena.

History

Pößneck, which is of Slavonic origin, passed about 1300 to the Landgrave of Thuringia. Later it belonged to Saxony and later still to the duchy of Saxe-Coburg-Saalfeld, passing to Saxe-Meiningen in 1826.

A Gothic church built about 1390 now serves an Evangelical congregation.  Pößneck also contains a Gothic town-hall erected during the succeeding century.

Balloon escape

Pößneck was the home of the Strelzyk and Wetzel families prior to 15 September 1979, when both families flew out of East Germany in a homemade hot air balloon. Following the end of the Cold War and German reunification, they eventually moved back to Pößneck. Their story was the subject of the 1982 film Night Crossing.

Economy
Its chief industries are the making of flannel, porcelain, furniture, machines, musical instruments, and chocolate. The town has also tanneries, breweries, dyeworks and brickworks.

Notable people
Albert Wagner (1848 - 1898), architect in New York City
 Robert Diez (1844–1922), sculptor, created among others the fountains of the Albert place in Dresden
 Rudolf Koch (1856–1921), press drawer
 Alfred Maul (1870–1942), engineer, pioneer of air reconnaissance
 Konrad Enke (1934–2016), swimmer
 Roland Matthes (1950–2019), swimmer
 Nico Herzig (born 1983), football player
 Denny Herzig (born 1984), football player
 Maurice Hehne (born 1997), football player

References

Towns in Thuringia
Saale-Orla-Kreis
Duchy of Saxe-Meiningen